There is No Escape, also known as The Dark Road and The Thurston Story, is a 1948 British drama film from Hammer Films.

It was Michael Ripper's first appearance in a Hammer Film.

The film was based on the career of criminal Stanley Thurston, who appeared in the cast as a character based on himself.  Thurston was famous for his numerous escapes from prison, 5 times in 15 years. He was released from prison in October 1946.

The film had trouble with the British censors who thought the film glamorised a real life criminal. Thurston had to be billed as "Charles Stuart."

James Carreras said, "The picture already has official police approval. I
have done everything to show that crime is a mug's game. Thurston is the only non-professional actor in the film. All he asked was £10 a week to cover expenses. At the end of the film he turns to the audience and tells them that a criminal life just isn't worth the candle, especially when guns are brought into crime. He made such a good job of the picture that I had him listed for a racing story on his merits as an actor. That plan will now have to be shelved."

The film was shot at Marylebone Studios.

Cast

References

External links

The Dark Road at BFI

1948 films
British drama films
1948 drama films
British black-and-white films
1940s English-language films
1940s British films